The Amazing Race Australia 2 is the second season of the Australian reality television game show The Amazing Race Australia, the Australian version of The Amazing Race. The show was produced by activeTV Australia.

This season premiered on Australia's Seven Network on 30 May 2012, one week after the last episode of the twentieth season of the American version aired in Australia. The show moved back to its old Monday schedule at 7:30 p.m. on 25 June 2012.

Police officers Shane Haw and Andrew Thoday were the winners of this season.

Production

Filming and Development

On 17 July 2011, the Seven Network announced that the show was renewed for a second edition.

Filming began on 18 November 2011 in Sydney. The 2012 edition marked a first time visit by a Eurasian or Australian edition of the franchise to the Americas, including the first visit by an Amazing Race franchise to the nation of Cuba, a country the original American edition couldn't visit at the time as the United States embargo against Cuba prevented Americans from visiting the island but restrictions have since been loosened due to the Cuban thaw of the Obama Administration. This season was also the first version outside of the American edition to circumnavigate the globe.

Three new twists were introduced in this season. The Salvage Pass was awarded in Leg 1, giving the recipient team a choice between a one-hour head start or saving the last team from elimination in that leg, a U-Turn vote in Leg 4 that required all teams to vote for the team to be U-Turned at the start of the leg (This twist was also used in the second Israeli season which was also produced by ActiveTV) and an Anonymous U-Turn in Leg 5, in which the team who elected to use it would remain anonymous (this twist was first adopted in the fourteenth American season under the name Blind U-Turn). In Leg 6, a Yield was present for the first time in the Australian version.

During Leg 4, Lucy & Emilia were detained for driving into the grounds of a royal palace in Dubai, however, they were eventually released with a warning.

Casting
Applications for the season ended on 19 August 2011.

Broadcasting
The show was on hiatus from 30 July to 6 August 2012 to avoid clashing with the 2012 Summer Olympics. The final three episodes aired from 13 August 2012 on consecutive nights.

Marketing
Honda, Bing Lee and PUMP Water continued their sponsorship. The new sponsors for this series were Zuji Australia, a sister company of Travelocity (an official sponsor of the original American version) at the time, and Swisse Vitamins.

Cast

On 20 April 2012, the teams were announced by the Seven Network. The cast includes Indigenous Australian cousins, cops, a pair of hairdressers, identical twins and St. George Illawarra Dragons cheerleaders Michelle and Jo Troy, former Australian rules footballer Ross Thornton and his daughter Tarryn, and the franchise's first disabled contestant, Sticky, who was born without a left forearm. Lucy & Emilia were originally cast for the previous series but dropped out at the last minute after their mother was diagnosed with cancer.

Future appearances
In 2018, Sarah Roza appeared on the fifth season of Married at First Sight.

Results
The following teams participated in the season, each listed along with their placements in each leg. Note that this table is not necessarily reflective of all content broadcast on television due to inclusion or exclusion of some data. Placements are listed in finishing order.

A  placement with a dagger indicates that the team was eliminated.
An  placement with a double-dagger indicates that the team was the last to arrive at a pit stop in a non-elimination leg, and was "marked for elimination" in the following leg.
An  placement indicates that the team came in last on an elimination leg at a pit stop, but were saved by the team with the Salvage Pass.
 An italicised and underlined placement indicates that the team was the last to arrive at a pit stop, but there was no rest period at the pit stop and all teams were instructed to continue racing.
A  indicates that the team won the Fast Forward. 
 A  indicates that the team used a U-Turn and a  indicates the team on the receiving end of a U-Turn. 
A  indicates that the team used the Yield and a  indicates the team on the receiving end of the Yield. 
A  indicates that the teams encountered an Intersection.

Notes

Prizes
The prize for each leg, with the exception of Leg 7, was awarded to the first place team for that leg.

Leg 1 – A$10,000 from Swisse Vitamins and the Salvage Pass, which can be used in one of two ways: the team can either give themselves a 1-hour time credit at the start of the next leg or save the last arriving team from elimination.
Leg 2 – A trip for two to the Japan MotoGP, with VIP Backstage Passes from Honda, worth A$10,000 and the Express Pass.
Leg 3 – A state of the art home entertainment package from Bing Lee, worth A$5,000.
Leg 4 – A trip for two to Queenstown, New Zealand, from PUMP Water, worth A$10,000.
Leg 5 – A trip for two to the Australian Rally Championship from Honda, worth A$10,000.
Leg 6 – A state of the art computer package from Bing Lee, worth A$5,000.
Leg 8 – A trip for two to Queenstown, New Zealand, from PUMP Water, worth A$10,000.
Leg 9 – A$10,000 from Southern Cross Travel Insurance.
Leg 10 – A$10,000 from Swisse Vitamins.
Leg 11 – A$10,000 from Southern Cross Travel Insurance.
Leg 12 – A$250,000.

Race summary

Leg 1 (Australia → Philippines)

Airdate: 30 May 2012
Sydney, New South Wales, Australia (City Centre – Royal Botanic Garden) (Starting Line)
 Sydney (Man O'War Steps to Barangaroo Wharf)
 Sydney (Sydney Airport) to Manila, Philippines (Ninoy Aquino International Airport)
Manila (Plaza Miranda)
 Quezon City (Araneta Center – Bicol Isarog TSI Bus Terminal) to Daraga (Cagsawa Ruins) 
 Daraga (Cagsawa Ruins) to Bacacay (Misibis Bay Resort and Casino – Luyang Beach)
 Bacacay (Misibis Bay Resort and Casino – Luyang Beach to Mosboron Beach) 

This season's first Detour was a choice between Jig or Pig. In Jig, teams had to don traditional costumes then learn and perform a traditional Ibalong Festival dance to the satisfaction of four judges to receive their next clue. In Pig, teams had to compete in a fiesta game called Agawan Baboy: "Catch the Oily Pig". After covering each other in oil, each team member had to enter a muddy pen, catch two pigs and put them in another pen to receive their next clue from a farmer.

Additional tasks
From the Man O'War Steps, teams had to travel by boat, each of which carried one team, to Barangaroo Wharf. There, they had to remove a marked Honda CR-Z from a large maze by moving the 24 surrounding black cars only in either a forward or reverse direction much like Rush Hour. Both team members had to be in a car to move it. When they were done, teams were given their next clue and could use their car to drive themselves to the airport.
At Plaza Miranda, teams had to find a marked stall and eat eight baluts before receiving their next clue from the egg seller.
At Bicol Isarog TSI Bus Terminal, teams had to sign up for one of three charter buses to Daraga. The first three teams would be on the first bus, the next four teams on the second bus, and the remaining teams on the last bus. Each bus left half an hour apart starting from 12:30 a.m. Once in Daraga, teams had to find a snake charmer, who would give their next clue, near the Cagsawa Ruins.
After the Detour, teams had to board a jeepney that would take them to Luyang Beach, where they had to build a raft with the provided materials and paddle themselves to the Pit Stop at Mosboron Beach.

Additional note
Lucy & Emilia arrived last at the pit stop and were supposed to be eliminated. However, Ross & Tarryn used their Salvage Pass to save them from elimination.

Leg 2 (Philippines → India)

Airdate: 6 June 2012
 Bacacay (Misibis Bay Resort and Casino) to Pasay (Ninoy Aquino International Airport)
 Manila (Ninoy Aquino International Airport) to Delhi, India (Indira Gandhi International Airport)
Delhi (Agrasen Ki Baoli)
 Bhalswa (Jabbar and Laallu's Dairy)
Delhi (Old Fort – Qila-i-Kuhna Mosque)
Delhi (Khari Baoli)  (Unaired)
Delhi (Qutub Minar) 

This leg's Detour was a choice between Pull or Poo. Both Detour options required teams to travel to Jabbar and Laallu's Dairy in Bhalswa. In Pull, both team members had to milk a cow until they each collected a half-litre of milk, which they could exchange for their next clue. In Poo, teams had to make 50 fuel bricks out of cow dung and hay then stick them to a wall to receive their next clue.

In an unaired Roadblock, one team member had search Khari Baoli for a marked store, where they had to fill Hessian bags with chilli peppers and then carry the bags through the market's alleyways to load them onto a cart and receive their next clue.

Additional tasks
At Agrasen Ki Baoli, teams had to search through a group of men wearing turbans for one that had the word "correct" hidden within his turban to receive their next clue. If teams chose an incorrect turban, they had to rewrap it before they could continue searching.
At the Old Fort, teams had to learn and perform a Bollywood dance and then recite a Hindi script to the director's satisfaction to receive their next clue.

Leg 3 (India)

Airdate: 13 June 2012 (Rest of Australia); 14 June 2012 (ACT, QLD, NSW)
 Delhi to Jaipur (Shiv Vilas) (Pit Start)
Jaipur (Red Elephant Temple) 
 Jaipur (Bharat Driving and Maintenance Training School)
Jaipur (Jaipur Market)
 Amer (Panna Meena ka Kund)
Jaipur (Nahargarh Fort – Madhavendra Palace) 

This leg had an unaired Detour at the Red Elephant Temple that was a choice between firewalking over hot coals or lying on a bed of nails for a set period of time. After either task, teams would receive a blessing from the priest before being given their next clue.

In this season's first aired Roadblock, teams had to make their way to Bharat Driving and Maintenance Training School, where one team member had to sit through a driver's education class on Indian road signs before driving through the chaotic streets of Jaipur to Jaipur Market to receive their next clue.

In this leg's second Roadblock, one team member, regardless of who performed the first Roadblock, had to figure out a path from the top of a stepwell of walking 41 steps down and 10 steps up to reach a guru and receive their next clue.

Additional task
At Jaipur Market, teams had to stack an ox cart with 75 clay pots and deliver them to the other end of the market to receive their next clue. If teams broke more than 15 pots along the way, they would receive a 15-minute penalty before receiving their next clue.

Additional note
During the Pit Stop, all teams were transported by bus to Shiv Vilas in Jaipur to begin this leg.

Leg 4 (India → United Arab Emirates)

Airdate: 20 June 2012
 Jaipur (Jaipur Junction Railway Station) to Delhi (New Delhi Railway Station)
 Delhi (Indira Gandhi International Airport) to Dubai, United Arab Emirates (Dubai International Airport)
 Al Faqa (Al Faqa Desert) 
Dubai (Wild Wadi Water Park) 
Dubai (Meydan Racecourse)
Dubai (Four Points Helipad) 

This leg's Detour was a choice between Camel Dash or Dune Bash. Both Detour options required teams to drive themselves to the Al Faqa Desert. In Camel Dash, teams had to ride a camel through a course and retrieve four coloured flags to receive their next clue. In Dune Bash, teams had to drive a dune buggy  around a flagged desert track to receive their next clue. Teams found the U-Turn reveal board at the end of the Detour.

There was an unaired Roadblock during the leg, which involved one team member abseiling down a building to receive their next clue.

Additional tasks
Before leaving Jaipur, teams had to vote for who they wished to U-Turn. Afterwards, they would board an overnight train back to Delhi and catch a flight to Dubai. Upon arrival in Dubai, teams had to find a marked Honda Accord containing their next clue in the airport car park. The vote was an open vote, and the voting order was determined by most number of votes. The team's votes, as well as the voting order, outlined below.
{|class="wikitable" style="text-align:center"
|-
!align="left"|U-Turned
|Paul & Steve
|-
!align="left"|Result
|6–1–1–1
|-
!Voter
!Team's Vote
|-
!Shane & Andrew
|bgcolor=tan | Paul & Steve
|-
!Paul & Steve
|Sticky & Sam
|-
!Michelle & Jo
|bgcolor=tan | Paul & Steve
|-
!Joseph & Grace
|bgcolor=tan | Paul & Steve
|-
!Lucy & Emilia
|Shane & Andrew
|-
!James & Sarah
|Lucy & Emilia
|-
!Sticky & Sam
|bgcolor=tan | Paul & Steve
|-
!Ross & Tarryn
|bgcolor=tan | Paul & Steve
|-
!Kym & Donna
|bgcolor=tan | Paul & Steve
|}
At Wild Wadi Water Park, teams had to use boogie boards to surf their way to the bottom of the FlowRider and grab their next clue.
At Meydan Racecourse, teams had to pick a winning horse in a horse race to receive their next clue.

Additional note
Kym & Donna fell so far behind and could not find their way to the Roadblock. Hours after all the teams had already checked into the pit stop, Kym & Donna still had not completed the leg, and Grant came over to the area where they had spent the night to inform them of their elimination.

Leg 5 (United Arab Emirates → Turkey)

Airdate: 25 June 2012
Dubai (Jumeirah Beach Hotel Marina – Dubai Pearl )
 Dubai (Al-Arsa Souq or Gold Souq)
Dubai (Deira Old Souq Station) 
 Dubai (Dubai International Airport) to Istanbul, Turkey (Istanbul Atatürk Airport)
Istanbul (Blue Mosque)
 Istanbul (Hagia Sophia and Basilica Cistern)
Istanbul (Archaeological Museum) 

This leg's Detour was a choice between Count 'Em Up or Price 'Em Up. In Count 'Em Up, teams had to make their way to Al-Arsa Souq and correctly count the number of dried limes in a sack to receive their next clue. In Price 'Em Up, teams had to make their way to a marked jewellery store in the Gold Souq and arrange seven pieces of jewellery from the cheapest to the most expensive to receive their next clue.

In this leg's Roadblock, one team member had to memorise eight Arabic symbols, which list the names of Husayn ibn Ali, Ali, Umar, Muhammad, Allah, Abu Bakr, Uthman and Hasan ibn Ali, within the main dome of Hagia Sophia and then line them up on a vertical column at the Basilica Cistern. They could only go back to Hagia Sophia once if they were unable to recall the symbols. Once the symbols were ordered correctly, they could retrieve their next clue from a pool of leeches.

Additional tasks
At Jumeirah Beach Hotel Marina, teams had to wait for the Dubai Pearl dhow and then board the ship to find the skipper with their next clue. 
After completing the Detour, teams had to travel by foot to Deira Old Souq Station, where they would encounter the Anonymous U-Turn board before retrieving their next clue.
At the Blue Mosque, teams had to search the mosque's grounds for a sultan with their next clue.

Leg 6 (Turkey)

Airdate: 2 July 2012
Istanbul (Ayasofya Hürrem Sultan Hamamı)
 Istanbul (Yeni Camii or Egyptian Bazaar) 
Istanbul (Rumelihisarı) 
 Istanbul (Darüzziyafe Restaurant)
Istanbul (Beyazıt Square) 

This leg's Detour was a choice between Shine or Design. In Shine, teams had to choose one of four marked shoe shine stalls outside Yeni Camii and convince 10 locals to have their shoes shined for no less than four liras each to receive their next clue. In Design, teams had to find a marked carpet store in the Egyptian Bazaar, choose a photograph depicting a section of Turkish carpet, and find a perfect match among the hundreds of carpets to receive their next clue. Before starting either task, teams would encounter the Yield board.

In this leg's Roadblock, one team member had to continuously spin with whirling dervishes for five minutes to receive their next clue from the master dervish.

Additional tasks
At Ayasofya Hürrem Sultan Hamami, team members had to scrub each other using a provided bar of soap until the word 'Detour' was revealed in the soap to receive their next clue.
At Rumelihisarı, teams encountered an Intersection. After joining up, one of the four members from the Intersected teams had to break through a line of four Turkish oil wrestlers and grab an oil lamp off a table to receive their next clue. Afterwards, teams were no longer Intersected.

Leg 7 (Turkey → France → Cuba)

Airdate: 9 July 2012
 Istanbul (Istanbul Atatürk Airport) to Paris, France (Charles de Gaulle Airport)
Paris (Le Cordon Bleu) 
Rungis (Rungis Wholesale Market)
Paris (Alléosse Cheese Shop)
Paris (Debilly Footbridge)
 Paris (Charles de Gaulle Airport) to Havana, Cuba (José Martí International Airport)
 Havana (Cigar Factory or Park) (Unaired)
Havana (Tropicana Nightclub)
Havana (Hotel Nacional) 

In this leg's culinary-themed Roadblock, one team member had to sign up for a cooking class, the first of which started at 9:00 p.m. with four team members and the second of which would start an hour later with the remaining team members, and bake a batch of Grand Marnier soufflés to the satisfaction of the school's director to receive their next clue.

This leg had an unaired Detour in Havana that was a choice between each team member rolling two Cuban cigars or learning a dance to receive their next clue. Sticky & Sam used their Express Pass during the cigar rolling Detour, which went unaired.

Additional tasks
At the Debilly Footbridge, teams had to find a painter with their next clue.
After arriving in Havana, teams had to find a marked classic car located outside of the airport with their next clue. 
At the Tropicana Nightclub, teams had to find the lead showgirl to receive their next clue.

Leg 8 (Cuba)

Airdate: 16 July 2012
Havana (Marina Hemingway) (Overnight Rest) 
 Havana (Old Havana – Plaza de la Catedral or El Floridita Bar and Hotel Ambos Mundos) 
Ciénaga de Zapata (Crocodile Farm)
 Ciénaga de Zapata (Laguna del Tesoro – Hotel Villa Guamá) 

In this leg's Roadblock, one team member had to either use a compass and a nautical chart with two coordinates to locate a fishing boat with "the old fisherman of the sea" on board or catch a fish if they couldn't find the fisherman to receive their next clue. If racers could not complete the Roadblock within an hour, then they would incur a four-hour penalty.

This leg's Detour was a choice between Che Puzzle or Daiquiri Guzzle. In Che Puzzle, teams had to complete a 90-piece puzzle of Che Guevara at Plaza de la Catedral in Old Havana to receive their next clue. In Daiquiri Guzzle, both team members had to make six daiquiris at El Floridita Bar and then carry them on a tray with one hand to Ernest Hemingway's old room at the Hotel Ambos Mundos. If none of the daiquiris had spilt past a red line or had been dropped along the way, teams would receive their next clue. Otherwise, they had to go back to the bar and make the daiquiris again.

Additional tasks
At the Marina Hemingway, teams had to sign up for one of four departure times for a charter boat departing 30 minutes apart starting from 8:00 a.m the following day and would receive their next clue after boarding the boat.
After the Detour, teams had to drive to a crocodile farm near the village of Australia, where they had to feed Cuban crocodiles in a marked enclosure and catch a crocodile to receive their next clue instructing them to travel on foot and by a marked boat across the Laguna del Tesoro to the Hotel Villa Guamá to find the next Pit Stop.

Additional note
At an unknown point in the leg, teams encountered a U-Turn vote. The vote and U-Turn of Sticky & Sam went unaired in the episode. It was an open vote, and the voting order was determined by most number of votes. The team's votes, as well as the voting order, outlined below.
{|class="wikitable" style="text-align:center"
|-
!align="left"|U-Turned
|Sticky & Sam
|-
!align="left"|Result
|4–2–1
|-
!Voter
!Team's Vote
|-
!Shane & Andrew
|Paul & Steve
|-
!Paul & Steve
|bgcolor=tan | Sticky & Sam
|-
!Michelle & Jo
|bgcolor=tan | Sticky & Sam
|-
!Joseph & Grace
|bgcolor=tan | Sticky & Sam
|-
!Lucy & Emilia
|Shane & Andrew
|-
!James & Sarah
|bgcolor=tan | Sticky & Sam
|-
!Sticky & Sam
|Paul & Steve
|}

Leg 9 (Cuba → Canada)

Airdate: 23 July 2012
Havana (El Capitolio) (Pit Start)
 Havana (José Martí International Airport) to Vancouver, British Columbia, Canada (Vancouver International Airport)
Vancouver (Stanley Park)
 Vancouver (Vancouver Rowing Club to Harbour Green Park Dock)
Vancouver (Nicole Sleeth Studio) 
 North Vancouver (The Learning Lodge)
  North Vancouver (Grouse Mountain Skyride)
Vancouver (CRAB Park at Portside) 

In this season's only Fast Forward, one team had to travel to an art studio, where they would discover that they had to strip nude and model in a life drawing class in front of six artists. Once the students completed their sketches, the art teacher would hand the team the Fast Forward award. Paul & Steve won the Fast Forward.

This leg's lumberjack-inspired Detour was a choice between Toss or Tumble. Both Detours options required that teams travel to The Learning Lodge near Rice Lake and dress up in lumberjack clothing. In Tumble, teams had to take part in logrolling and roll a marked log so that it rotated 10 times in a pool of water to receive their next clue from a Canadian logrolling champion. If a team member fell off the log, they had to swap with their partner and continue.

In this leg's Roadblock, one team member had to stand on top of a cable car riding up towards the top of Grouse Mountain and grab three flags as they passed to receive their next clue. If racers were unsuccessful after three ascents, then they would incur a four-hour time penalty.

Additional tasks
At Stanley Park, teams had to find the totem poles and watch a traditional Squamish First Nations dance before receiving a blessing by the chief, along with their next clue, which instructed teams had to collect two paddles and take them to the Vancouver Rowing Club, where they would find their next clue.
At the Vancouver Rowing Club, teams had to pick a kayak and paddle to Harbour Green Park Dock, where they had to decipher a series of maritime flags, in which each flag represents a letter, to spell out a nautical phrase ("Three sheets to the wind, splice to the mainbrace, weigh anchor and set sail.") and receive their next clue.

Leg 10 (Canada)

Airdate: 13 August 2012
 Vancouver (The Westin Bayshore) to Banff, Alberta (Banff National Park Administration Building)
Banff (Wild Bill's Saloon)
Canmore (Rundle Mountain) 
 Lake Louise (Lake Louise Ski Resort)
Banff National Park (Great Divide Trail)
Lake Louise (Chateau Lake Louise)
Banff (Banff Springs Hotel) 

In this leg's Roadblock, one team member had to ice climb  to the top of a frozen waterfall using ice axes and crampons to retrieve their next clue.

This leg's Detour was a choice between Search or Ski. Both Detour options required teams to drive themselves to the Lake Louise Ski Resort in Lake Louise and pick up skiing equipment before taking the ski lift up the mountain. In Search, teams had to use an avalanche rescue beacon to search a  area for a transmitter buried beneath the snow that they could exchange for their next clue. In Ski, both team members had to complete a slalom skiing course by weaving past all the flags and then, in an unaired segment, place photos of the teams who finished lasted in the previous nine legs in chronological order to receive their next clue.

Additional tasks
At The Westin Bayshore hotel, teams had to sign up for one of two buses, the first of which carried two teams and departed an hour before the second, to their next destination: Banff, Alberta.
At Wild Bill's Saloon, teams had to ride a mechanical bull for a combined total of at least 60 seconds to receive their next clue. Teams had an option to hang on the bull for an even longer time as the team with the longest time would have a 30-minute head start in the next task, the Roadblock.
After the Detour, teams had to travel through the Great Divide Trail in Banff National Park where they had to lead a team of sled dogs around a  course to find their next clue
At Chateau Lake Louise, teams had to use provided random items, including a shoe, a back scrubber and a bottle opener, to extract a clue from an ice sculpture.

Leg 11 (Canada → China)

Airdate: 14 August 2012
 Banff (Banff Springs Hotel) to Calgary (Calgary International Airport)
 Calgary (Calgary International Airport) to Beijing, China (Beijing Capital International Airport)
Beijing (Ghost Street)
 Beijing (Liang An Yi Jia)
Beijing (Wuzhisheng Foot Reflection Health Center)
Beijing (Marco Polo Bridge)
 Beijing (Great Wall of China – Mutianyu)
Beijing (Forbidden City – Tàimiào Temple) 

This leg's Detour was a choice between Waiter or Wheel. In Waiter, teams had to take food orders from eight restaurant customers spoken in Mandarin Chinese and recite each order to the chef. If they pronounced the orders correctly, the chef would give them the meals to serve to the customers. Once every customer received their meal, teams would receive their next clue. In Wheel, team members had to spin a Lazy Susan with the names of Chinese delicacies on it and their partner had to eat whatever it landed on. After each team member ate two dishes, they would receive their next clue.

In this leg's Roadblock, one team member had to pass through nine rows of warriors to retrieve their next clue. In each row, only one warrior would let them through and the others would block them. If the team member was blocked by a warrior three times, they would have to go back to the first row and start again.

Additional tasks
On Ghost Street, teams had to find a marked stall with their next clue.
At Wuzhisheng Foot Reflection Health Center, both team members had to endure a continuous ten-minute reflexology foot massage, five minutes for each foot, before receiving their next clue from the masseuse. In the event racers were unable to bear the painful part of the massage, they could pull their foot away to signal the masseuse to stop; however, the consequence of doing so would result in restarting the massage from the beginning. 
At Marco Polo Bridge, teams had to correctly count the number of lion head statues on the bridge (446) to receive their next clue.

Leg 12 (China → Australia)

Airdate: 15 August 2012
 Beijing (Beijing Capital International Airport) to Guilin (Guilin Liangjiang International Airport)
Guilin (Guihu Lake ) (Pit Start)
Guilin (Lijiang River)
 Yangshuo County (Kindergarten School)
Baisha (Baisha Market)
 Guilin (Guilin Liangjiang International Airport) to Brisbane, Queensland, Australia (Brisbane Airport)
Brisbane (Kangaroo Point –  Captain Burke Park)
Brisbane (Dutton Park – Boggo Road Gaol)
 Brisbane (Archerfield – Archerfield Airport) to Fraser Island (75 Mile Beach)
Fraser Island (Lake McKenzie)  

This season's final Detour required teams to travel to a kindergarten school in Yangshuo County to complete either Teach or Learn. In Teach, teams had to choose one of the Kindergarten students and teach them 10 Australian slang words. Once their student correctly recited all 10 words to the teacher, teams would receive their next clue. In Learn, teams had to choose one of the Kindergarten students who would teach them how to say the same 10 Australian slang words in Mandarin Chinese. If teams recited all 10 words correctly to the teacher, they would receive their next clue.

In this season's final Roadblock, one team member had to wade out to clue boxes in the lake which each contained a multiple choice question based on previous legs. Then they had to place coloured rings around the clue boxes which corresponded to the correct answer. If they got the questions right (five were shown, but seven clue boxes were present), they would receive the final clue.

{|class="wikitable" style="text-align:center"
|-
!align="left"|Question
!colspan=2|Answer
|-
!The famous nightclub you visited upon arrival in Havana is called:
|style="background: #595647;"|
|Tropicana
|-
!The famous cooking school you attended in Paris was:
|style="background: #D39644;"|
|Le Cordon Bleu
|-
!In Istanbul you scrubbed each other down. What is the correct term for a Turkish bath?
|style="background: #A54328;"|
|Hammam
|-
!Which of the following is NOT a mode of transport you travelled on during the Race?
|style="background: #A54328;"|
|Canoe
|-
!The Pit Stop in Jaipur was located on the rooftop of which fort?
|style="background: #595647;"|
|Nahargarh Fort
|}

Additional tasks
On the Lijiang River, teams had to don traditional fishermen costumes before paddling out to the river and asking each fisherman in Mandarin Chinese "Do you have something for me?" until they received their next clue. If a team asked a wrong fisherman, they would be given a fish instead.
At Baisha Market, teams had to locate a marked stall and convince 10 locals to buy a vegetable slicer for no less than ¥5 each to receive their next clue.
Upon arrival in Brisbane, teams had to search the airport car park for a marked vehicle containing their next clue, instructing them to find their next clue at Captain Burke Park.
At Boggo Road Gaol, teams had to find a prison warden with their next clue. Then, one team member had to answer five questions, and their partner had to match the answers to receive their next clue.
{|class="wikitable" style="text-align:center"
|-
!rowspan=2|Questions
!colspan=3|Answers
|-
!Michelle & Jo
!Paul & Steve
!Shane & Andrew
|-
!Which team would lend you a helping hand?
|Shane & Andrew
|Lucy & Emilia
|Michelle & Jo
|-
!Which team would lie to you?
|Joseph & Grace
|Michelle & Jo
|Paul & Steve
|-
!Which team worked best together?
|Shane & Andrew
|Lucy & Emilia
|Shane & Andrew
|-
!Whose relationship do you envy?
|Ross & Tarryn
|Sticky & Sam
|Sticky & Sam
|-
!Which was the unluckiest team?
|Adam & Dane
|Adam & Dane
|Adam & Dane
|-
|}
At Archerfield Airport, teams had to board a charter flight to their final destination: Fraser Island. Once on Fraser Island, teams had to drive themselves to Lake McKenzie to find their next clue.
After the Roadblock, teams had to dig up a treasure chest containing A$250,000 within a marked area and carry it to the nearby Finish Line.

Additional note
During the Pit Stop, all teams were flown from Beijing to Guilin and began the final leg at Guihu Lake.

Episode title quotes
Episode titles are often taken from quotes made by the racers.

"Don't Need More Friends, Always Need More Money" – Donna
"We Only Picked Good Looking Ones" – Lucy
"I Don't Really Like to Use My Brain" – Grace
"No More Showing Off" – Grace
"I Know What a Lime is Daddy!" – Tarryn
"Take a Seat... My Stunning Specimen of a Man!" – Lucy
"How Do You Fold Liquid?" – Grace
"It's a Pit Pause" – Sarah
"Why Am I Trying to Ride a Log on Icy Water?" – Lucy
"I Do My Riding Better in the Bedroom" – Steve
"You Have a Smiley Face on Front" – Jo
"I'm Sorry My Looks, My Facial Expressions Annoy You!" – Paul

Ratings

 Episode 3, aired on 13 June in most areas and 14 June in New South Wales, Queensland and Australian Capital Territory and because of that, it is unknown how many people watched the show in each area as this episode was not in the top 20 on either night.
 No episodes aired between 30 July and 6 August, to avoid clashing with the 2012 Summer Olympics.

Notes

References

External links
 Official website

Australia 2
2012 Australian television seasons
Television shows filmed in Australia
Television shows filmed in the Philippines
Television shows filmed in India
Television shows filmed in the United Arab Emirates
Television shows filmed in Turkey
Television shows filmed in France
Television shows filmed in Cuba
Television shows filmed in British Columbia
Television shows filmed in Alberta
Television shows filmed in China